Beaver Scouts, usually referred to as Beavers, is the youngest section of Scouting operated by the Baden-Powell Scouts' Association. The core age range for Beaver Scouts is six to eight years, though exceptions can be granted. Individual sections of Beaver Scouts, known as a Colony, are run by the local Scout Group. After reaching the age of eight, a Beaver Scout will then move on to Wolf Cubs.

History
Originating in Canada in 1973, Beaver Scouts have been a section of the Baden-Powell Scouts' Association since 1982 as a response to other Youth Organisations, such as the Boy's Brigade opening their doors to younger children.

Organisation
A Beaver Colony is a section of the Scout Group aimed at children from 6 to 8 years.  The Scout Leader in charge of the Colony will be a Beaver Scout Leader, assisted by Assistant Beaver Scout Leader and Section Assistants.

Beaver Scout Colonies are controlled by the local Scout Group, with each colony being divided into a number of Lodges.  The Beaver in charge of a Lodge is known as a 'Lodge Leader', who is assisted by a 'Assistant Lodge Leader'. This is a similar role to that of Senior Sixer in the Wolf Cub pack.

Programme

UK Promise
The Beaver Scout promise is a simpler version of the Scout promise:
I promise to do my best,
To be kind and helpful
and to love God.

UK Motto
The Beaver Scouts motto is "Busy and Bright".

UK Beaver Prayer
Dear Lord, help me to be a good Beaver,
always busy and bright.
Be with those so dear to me
and help me do things right.  Amen.

UK Uniform

The Beaver Scout uniform is a turquoise and with a group scarf (neckerchief) with black or grey shorts, trousers or skirts and black shoes

International Variations
International sections of the Baden-Powell Scouts' Association have variations on the above, an example of which being B-PSA Ireland's Beaver Promise of, "I promise to love God and to Help take care of the World."

Awards and Badges
Beaver Scouts can earn a number of awards and badges.

See also
 Beavers (Scouting)
 Age Groups in Scouting and Guiding

References

Further reading

External links
 B-PSA UK Beaver Scout Programme

.

Baden-Powell Scouts' Association